Tour of Malopolska (Polish: Małopolski Wyścig Górski) is an annual, professional men's multiple-stage cycling race in Lesser Poland Voivodeship. Since 2005, it has been part of the UCI Europe Tour.

History
The race was first held in 1961 and is one of the oldest bicycle races in Poland. Zbigniew Piątek holds the record for the most victories with three, in 1989, 1998 and 2001. The race usually consists of three or four stages as well as a prologue. The prologue is usually organized at the Main Market Square in Kraków and the points won are included in the general classification. Most of the race consists of hilly or mountain stages. Since 2015, the first stage of Tour of Małopolska has been taking place on the Alwernia – Trzebinia route.

The most recent winner is Jonas Rapp of Germany.

Past winners
Source:

See also
Tour de Pologne
Sport in Poland
Road cycling

References

External links

Cycle races in Poland
Recurring sporting events established in 1961
Sport in Lesser Poland Voivodeship
UCI Europe Tour races
1961 establishments in Poland